Terribile was the first ironclad warship to be built for the Italian Regia Marina (Royal Navy), and the second member of the . Terribile and her sister, were both built in France. A broadside ironclad, she was laid down in June 1860, launched in February 1861, and was completed in September that year. She was the first Italian ironclad to enter service and was equipped with four  and sixteen  guns.

The ship took part in the operation off Lissa in 1866 during the Third Italian War of Independence. There, was tasked with neutralizing the Austrian coastal batteries protecting the port at Comisa, which placed her too far away to take part in the ensuing Battle of Lissa. The ship's postwar career was limited due to a combination of drastically reduced naval budgets and the appearance of more modern ironclads. In 1885, Terribile was withdrawn from service for use as a training ship. She remained in service until 1904 when she was broken up for scrap.

Design

She had a crew of 371. Her propulsion system consisted of one single-expansion marine steam engine that drove a single screw propeller, with steam supplied by six coal-fired, rectangular fire-tube boilers. The boilers were vented through a single funnel. To supplement her steam engine, the ship was schooner-rigged.

Terribile was a broadside ironclad, armed with a main battery of four  guns and sixteen  rifled muzzle-loading guns.

Service history
Terribile was built by the Société Nouvelle des Forges et Chantiers de la Méditerranée shipyard in La Seyne; her keel was laid down in June 1860, the first member of her class to begin construction. She was launched on 16 February 1861 and was completed in September that year. Ordered for the Royal Sardinian Navy, by the time the ship had been completed Italy had unified and Terribile was instead commissioned into the new Regia Marina (Royal Navy). In June 1866, Italy declared war on Austria, as part of the Third Italian War of Independence, which was fought concurrently with the Austro-Prussian War. The Italian fleet commander, Admiral Carlo Pellion di Persano, initially adopted a cautious course of action; he was unwilling to risk battle with the Austrian Navy, despite the fact that the Austrian fleet was much weaker than his own. Persano claimed he was simply waiting on the ironclad ram , en route from Britain, but his inaction weakened morale in the fleet, with many of his subordinates openly accusing him of cowardice.

Rear Admiral Wilhelm von Tegetthoff brought the Austrian fleet to Ancona on June 27, in attempt to draw out the Italians. At the time, many of the Italian ships were in disarray; Terribile was carrying only half her guns at the time, and other ships were experiencing various difficulties with their engines or armament. Persano held a council of war aboard the ironclad  to determine whether he should sortie to engage Tegetthoff, but by that time, the Austrians had withdrawn, making the decision moot. The Minister of the Navy, Agostino Depretis, urged Persano to act and suggested the island of Lissa, to restore Italian confidence after their defeat at the Battle of Custoza the previous month. On 7 July, Persano left Ancona and conducted a sweep into the Adriatic, but encountered no Austrian ships and returned on the 13th.

Battle of Lissa

On 16 July, Persano took the Italian fleet out of Ancona, bound for Lissa, where they arrived on the 18th. With them, they brought troop transports carrying 3,000 soldiers; the Italian warships began bombarding the Austrian forts on the island, with the intention of landing the soldiers once the fortresses had been silenced. In response, the Austrian Navy sent the fleet under Tegetthoff to attack the Italian ships. After spending the 18th unsuccessfully bombarding the Austrian fortresses, the Italians withdrew late in the day, preparing to launch another attack the following morning. Persano ordered Terribile and Varese to attack the fortifications protecting the town of Comisa, while the rest of the fleet would attack the main port at Vis. These attacks again failed to defeat the Austrian defenders.

Persano repeated his orders for the 20th, with Terribile and Varese again tasked with suppressing the batteries at Comisa. Before the Italians could begin the attack, the dispatch boat  arrived, bringing news of Tegetthoff's approach. Persano's fleet was in disarray; Terribile and Varese were nine miles to the west of most of his ships, preparing to attack Comisa, and three other ironclads were to the north-east. Persano immediately recalled Terribile and Varese while he ordered his ships first into a line abreast formation, and then to line ahead formation. Shortly before the action began, Persano left his flagship, and transferred to Affondatore, though none of his subordinates on the other ships were aware of the change. They there thus left to fight as individuals without direction.

Terribile did not see action during the battle; she only fired a single long-range shot at the ship of the line . She had answered Persano's summons very slowly and only arrived on the scene after Re d'Italia had been rammed and sunk, and the coastal defense ship  had been set on fire, soon to be destroyed by a magazine explosion. Persano's forces had withdrawn, and though his ships still outnumbered the Austrians, Persano refused to counter-attack. The Italian fleet began to withdraw, followed by the Austrians; as night began to fall, the opposing fleets disengaged completely, heading for Ancona and Pola, respectively.

Later career

After the battle, Persano was replaced by Admiral Giovanni Vacca; he was ordered to attack the main Austrian naval base at Pola, but the war ended before the operation could be carried out. After the end of the war, the government lost confidence in the fleet and drastically reduced the naval budget. The cuts were so severe that the fleet had great difficulty in mobilizing its ironclad squadron to attack the port of Civitavecchia in September 1870, as part of the wars of Italian unification. Instead, the ships were laid up and the sailors conscripted to man them were sent home. Terribile was rapidly surpassed, first by central battery and then turret ships, which made the first generation of ironclads like Terribile and her sister obsolete.

On 3 December 1872, Terrible was driven ashore in a storm at Naples. In 1872–1873, the ship received new boilers. Her armament was significantly reduced in 1878 to eight 8-inch guns. Starting in 1885, Terribile was employed as a training ship. By that time her armament had been revised and now consisted of two  guns, two  guns, and two  guns alongside two torpedo tubes. She served in this capacity until 1904, when she was stricken from the naval register and subsequently broken up for scrap.

Notes

References

External links
 Terribile Marina Militare website 

Terribile
1861 ships
Ships built in France
Maritime incidents in December 1872